Huiroa is a settlement in inland Taranaki, in the western North Island of New Zealand. It is located 20 kilometres east of Stratford and eight kilometres north of Douglas. It is situated on the Stratford–Okahukura Line and it is not far from State Highway 43.

Further reading

General historical works

Schools

Stratford District, New Zealand
Populated places in Taranaki